1938 is the fifth studio album by American post-punk band Savage Republic, released in November 2007 by Neurot Recordings.

Track listing

Personnel
Adapted from the 1938 liner notes.

Savage Republic
 Thom Fuhrmann – instruments, production, design
 Greg Grunke – instruments
 Val Haller – instruments
 Ethan Port – instruments
 Alan Waddington – instruments

Production and design
 Ramona Clarke – photography, design
 Jon Crawford – recording
 Kerry Dowling – recording
 Reni Tulsi – recording
 Don C. Tyler – mastering

Release history

References

External links 
 1938 at Discogs (list of releases)

2007 albums
Savage Republic albums
Neurot Recordings albums